Pseudagrion is the largest genus of damselfly in the family Coenagrionidae,
with over 140 species. Its range includes most of Africa, much of Asia, and Australia. Africa holds most of the diversity with almost 100 species. It has occupied most of the freshwater habitats in its range, and dominates damselfly communities in habitats as different as desert pools, equatorial rainforests and montane streams.

On the African continent, the genus comprises two distinct groups: The "A-group" has about 45 species - they are predominantly highland species and males lack spines on S10; The "B-group" has about 25 species - mainly from lowlands and males have spines on S10. A third Afrotropical group comprises 31 species from the forest streams of Madagascar and the Comores.

Species
The genus Pseudagrion includes the following species:

Gallery of species without an article

References

Coenagrionidae
Zygoptera genera
Odonata of Oceania
Odonata of Asia
Odonata of Africa
Odonata of Australia
Taxa named by Edmond de Sélys Longchamps
Insects described in 1876
Damselflies
Taxonomy articles created by Polbot